is a railway station located in the town of Shōnai, Yamagata Prefecture, Japan, operated by the East Japan Railway Company (JR East).

Lines
Kita-Amarume Station is served by the Uetsu Main Line, and is located 157.4 rail kilometers from the terminus of the line at Niitsu Station.

Station layout
The station has two opposed side platforms connected by a level crossing. There is no station building. The station is unattended.

Platforms

History
Kita-Amarume Station was opened on February 1, 1964. With the privatization of the JNR on April 1, 1987, the station came under the control of the East Japan Railway Company.  On December 25, 2005 a train from Sagoshi Station derailed in bad weather near this station, killing five and injuring thirty-three.

Surrounding area
The station is located in a rural area surrounded by rice paddies. There are very few buildings in the vicinity of the station.

See also
 List of railway stations in Japan

References

External links

 JR East Station information 

Stations of East Japan Railway Company
Railway stations in Japan opened in 1964
Railway stations in Yamagata Prefecture
Uetsu Main Line
Shōnai, Yamagata